James Dunlop (17 May 1870 – 11 January 1892) was a Scottish footballer who played for St Mirren and Scotland. Dunlop cut his knee while playing for St Mirren (where he had risen to the position of club captain) and subsequently died due to a tetanus infection, aged 21.

He is buried in Woodside Cemetery in western Paisley. The grave stands at the top of the hill against the north side of the crematorium.

See also 
 List of association footballers who died while playing

References 

Sources

External links 
 
 London Hearts profile

1870 births
1892 deaths
Scottish footballers
Scotland international footballers
Association football inside forwards
St Mirren F.C. players
Footballers from Paisley, Renfrewshire
Deaths from tetanus
Scottish Football League players
Association football players who died while playing
Sport deaths in Scotland